Philotheca coccinea is a species of flowering plant in the family Rutaceae and is endemic to Western Australia. It is a shrub with club-shaped leaves that are warty on the lower surface, and red to pink flowers arranged singly in leaf axils.

Description
The ten stamens are free from each other and densely woolly-hairy.

Taxonomy and naming
This species was first formally described in 1939 by Charles Gardner who gave it the name Eriostemon coccineus. The description was published in Hooker's Icones Plantarum from specimens collected by William Blackall west of Coolgardie in 1931. In 1998 Paul G. Wilson changed the name to Philotheca coccinea in the journal Nuytsia.

Distribution and habitat
Philotheca coccinea grows in shrubland on rocky ridges and hillsides and on undulating plains from Southern Cross to Norseman.

Conservation status
This species is classified as "not threatened" by the Government of Western Australia Department of Parks and Wildlife.

References

coccinea
Flora of Western Australia
Sapindales of Australia
Plants described in 1939
Taxa named by Charles Gardner